The 1847 Pennsylvania gubernatorial election occurred on October 12, 1847. Incumbent Democratic  governor Francis R. Shunk defeated Whig candidate James Irvin to win re-election.

Results

References

1847
Pennsylvania
Gubernatorial
November 1847 events